Black Girl may refer to:

 A female Black person
 American R&B group BlackGirl
 Black Girl (1966 film), the English title of Ousmane Sembène's 1966 Senegalese film La Noire de... ..
 Black Girl (play) A play by J. E. Franklin that was later made into a 1972 film, directed by Ossie Davis
 Black Girl (1972 film), the film based on the play.
 An alternate name for the American folk song "In the Pines" or "Where Did You Sleep Last Night"
 "Black Girl", a 1993 song by Lenny Kravitz from Are You Gonna Go My Way
 Black Girls a song by the Violent Femmes on their Hallowed Ground (Violent Femmes album) ⋅
 Black Girls Rock!, an annual awards program broadcast by Black Entertainment Television